Henry Thomas Waghorn (11 April 1842 – 30 January 1930), was a cricket statistician and historian. He is best known for his two classic researches into cricket's early history: The Dawn of Cricket and Cricket Scores, Notes, etc. (1730 - 1773).

Waghorn was born in Tunbridge Wells, Kent. 
He had a career in the Army and then obtained a post at the British Museum, where he was able to indulge his love of research into old newspapers and periodicals. Painstakingly, he assembled a mass of information from cricket notices, including some previously undiscovered match scores, which he eventually published in his two books. He died in Walmer, Kent.

References

1842 births
1930 deaths
Cricket historians and writers
People from Royal Tunbridge Wells